The Copa Petrobras São Paulo was a tennis tournament held in São Paulo, Brazil from 2009 until 2010. Between 2004 and 2008, it was held in Aracaju except for the 2007 edition which was held in Belo Horizonte. The event was part of the ATP Challenger Tour and played on outdoor red clay courts.

Past finals

Singles

Doubles

External links 
Official website
ITF search

ATP Challenger Tour
Sport in São Paulo
Tennis tournaments in Brazil
2004 establishments in Brazil
Clay court tennis tournaments